Rato station is the southern terminus of the Yellow Line of the Lisbon Metro.

History
The station opened on 29 December 1997 and is located on Largo do Rato. 

The architectural design of the station is by Sanchez Jorge.

Connections

Urban buses

Carris 
 202 Cais do Sodré ⇄ Bairro Padre Cruz
 706 Cais do Sodré ⇄ Estação Santa Apolónia
 706 Restauradores ⇄ Campo de Ourique (Prazeres)
 713 Alameda D. A. Henriques ⇄ Estação Campolide
 720 Picheleira/Rua Faria Vasconcelos ⇄ Calvário
 727 Estação Roma-Areeiro ⇄ Restelo - Av. das Descobertas 
 738 Quinta dos Barros ⇄ Alto de Santo Amaro
 758 Cais do Sodré ⇄ Portas de Benfica
 774 Campo de Ourique (Prazeres) ⇄ Gomes Freire

See also
 List of Lisbon metro stations

References

External links

Yellow Line (Lisbon Metro) stations
Railway stations opened in 1997